Secamone racemosa is a species of plant in the family Apocynaceae. It is found in Burundi, Cameroon, the Democratic Republic of the Congo, Equatorial Guinea, Rwanda, and Uganda. Its natural habitat is subtropical or tropical moist montane forests. It is threatened by habitat loss.

References

racemosa
Vulnerable plants
Flora of West-Central Tropical Africa
Flora of Uganda
Taxonomy articles created by Polbot